Buxton School (formerly Cann Hall Primary School and Tom Hood School) is a mixed all-through school located in  Leytonstone, London, England.

The school was formed on 1 January 2010 from an amalgamation of Cann Hall Primary School and Tom Hood School. It currently educates pupils aged 3 to 16.

Notable former pupils

Tom Hood School
Bobby Moore, Former England Soccer Captain during the 1966 World Cup Win, and West Ham player
Plan B, Rapper
Chronik, Grime Artist
Dawn Butler, Member of Parliament

References

External links
Buxton School official website

Primary schools in the London Borough of Waltham Forest
Secondary schools in the London Borough of Waltham Forest
Foundation schools in the London Borough of Waltham Forest
Leytonstone